The women's 100m freestyle S7 event at the 2008 Summer Paralympics took place at the Beijing National Aquatics Center on 8 September. There were no heats in this event.

Final

Competed at 18:15.

 
PR = Paralympic Record.

References
 
 

Swimming at the 2008 Summer Paralympics
2008 in women's swimming